HMS Chatham was a 50-gun fourth rate ship of the line of the Royal Navy, launched on 20 October 1691 at Chatham Dockyard.

She underwent a rebuild according to the 1719 Establishment at Deptford in 1721.

Chatham was one of the British ships-of-the-line at the Battle of Toulon.

Fate
Chatham served until 1749, when she was sunk as a breakwater.

Citations and references
Citations

References

Lavery, Brian (2003) The Ship of the Line - Volume 1: The development of the battlefleet 1650-1850. Conway Maritime Press. .

Ships of the line of the Royal Navy
1690s ships
Ships sunk as breakwaters